Juan Diego Ormaechea (born 28 January 1989) is an Uruguayan rugby union player who generally plays as a number eight represents Uruguay internationally. He was included in the Uruguayan squad for the 2019 Rugby World Cup which is held in Japan for the first time and also marks his first World Cup appearance.

Career 
He made his international debut for Uruguay against Portugal on 13 November 2011.

References 

1989 births
Living people
Uruguayan rugby union players
Uruguay international rugby union players
Rugby union number eights
Rugby sevens players at the 2015 Pan American Games
Pan American Games competitors for Uruguay
Rugby union players from Montevideo